Carl Ona-Embo (born August 6, 1989) is a French-born Congolese professional basketball player who last played for Poitiers of the French LNB Pro B league. In the past, he played for the Santa Cruz Warriors of the NBA Development League.

Professional career
Ona-Embo played with Angelico Biella in the 2007–08 season. For the 2008–09 season he was loaned to Rosalía de Castro of the LEB Oro.

For the 2009–10 season, Ona-Embo returned to Angelico Biella.

In July 2010, Ona-Embo signed with Poitiers Basket 86 for the 2010–11 season.

From 2011 to 2013, Ona-Embo played with Cholet Basket. For the 2013–14 season he signed with Antibes Sharks.

In July 2014, Ona-Embo returned after three years to Poitiers Basket 86. In June 2015, he left Poitiers and signed with JL Bourg-en-Bresse.

On October 30, 2016, Ona-Embo was selected with the 49th pick of the 2016 NBA Development League draft by the Salt Lake City Stars. However, he was waived on November 8. On November 25, he was acquired by the Santa Cruz Warriors, but was waived on December 11 after averaging 2.2 points, 1.0 rebounds and 1.2 assists in 6 games.

On April 16, 2019, he has signed with Caen Basket of the French LNB.

DR Congo national team
Ona-Embo played 3 games for the DR Congo national basketball team at the 2019 FIBA Basketball World Cup qualification where he averaged 6.3 points, 3.3 rebounds and 2.3 assists per game.

References

External links
LNB Pro A profile
Euroleague.net profile
Eurobasket.com profile
FIBA.com profile

Living people
1989 births
Caen Basket Calvados players
Cholet Basket players
Democratic Republic of the Congo men's basketball players
French men's basketball players
JA Vichy-Clermont Métropole players
JL Bourg-en-Bresse players
Olympique Antibes basketball players
Pallacanestro Biella players
Poitiers Basket 86 players
PS Karlsruhe Lions players
Santa Cruz Warriors players
Sportspeople from Lille
Point guards
21st-century Democratic Republic of the Congo people